The El Chaparral port of entry or border crossing (Puerto Fronterizo El Chaparral) is as of 2012 the main vehicle crossing point from San Diego into Tijuana, Mexico, replacing the former entry point known as Puerta México which stood immediately east of El Chaparral. It is part of the San Ysidro Port of Entry. It is roughly in the same location as the former Virginia Avenue crossing, where trucks entering the US from Mexico prior to 1983, was located. The opening of El Chaparral roughly tripled the number of traffic lanes to 22, reducing wait times for vehicles entering Mexico. 
 

References

Ports of Entry in San Diego–Tijuana
Interstate 5